The Roman Catholic Archdiocese of Aracaju is a Latin Metropolitan archdiocese in the State of Sergipe, northeastern Brazil. Its cathedral archiepiscopal see is Our Lady of the Conception Cathedral (Catedral Metropolitana Nossa Senhora da Conceiçao), dedicated to Our Lady of Immaculate Conception, in the city of Aracaju. Two World Heritage Sites are owned by the Archdiocese in São Cristóvão, Sergipe: the Misericórdia Hospital and Church (Igreja de Santa Casa de Misericórdia) and the Church and Convent of Santa Cruz, also known as the Church and Convent of Saint Francis.

Statistics 
As per 2014, it pastorally served 1,086,000 Catholics (84.1% of 1,292,000 total) on 7,019 km² in 99 parishes with 159 priests (129 diocesan, 30 religious), 21 deacons, 321 lay religious (119 brothers, 202 sisters) and 34 seminarians.

History 
It was established on January 3, 1910, as Diocese of Aracaju, on territory split off from the Metropolitan Archdiocese of São Salvador da Bahia.
On April 30, 1960, it was promoted as Metropolitan Archdiocese of Aracaju, losing territory to establish its two suffragans: Diocese of Estância and Diocese of Propriá.

Ecclesiastical province 
Its Suffragan dioceses are both daughter sees :
 Roman Catholic Diocese of Estância
 Roman Catholic Diocese of Propriá

Episcopal ordinaries
(all Latin Rite Brazilians)

Suffragan Bishops of Aracaju 
 José Tomas Gomes da Silva (1911.05.12 – death 1948.10.31)
 Fernando Gomes dos Santos (1949.02.01 – 1957.03.07), previously Bishop of Penedo (Brazil) (1943.01.09 – 1949.02.01); later Metropolitan Archbishop of Goiânia (Brazil) (1957.03.07 – death 1985.06.01)
 José Vicente Távora (1957.11.20 – 1960.04.30 see below), previously Titular Bishop of Prusias ad Hypium (1954.06.23 – 1957.11.20) as Auxiliary Bishop of (São Sebastião do) Rio de Janeiro (Brazil) (1954.06.23 – 1957.11.20)

Metropolitan Archbishops of Aracaju 
 José Vicente Távora (see above 1960.04.30 – death 1970.04.03)
 Luciano José Cabral Duarte (1971.02.12 – retired 1998.08.26), also First Vice-President of Latin American Episcopal Council (1979 – 1983); succeeded as former Titular Bishop of Gadiaufala (1966.07.14 – 1971.02.12) and Auxiliary Bishop of Aracaju (1966.07.14 – 1971.02.12)
 José Palmeira Lessa (1998.08.26 – 2017.01.18); previously Titular Bishop of Sita (1982.06.21 – 1987.10.30) as Auxiliary Bishop of (São Sebastião do) Rio de Janeiro (Brazil) (1982.06.21 – 1987.10.30), Bishop of Propriá (Brazil) (1987.10.30 – 1996.12.06), Coadjutor Archbishop of Aracaju (1996.12.06 – succession 1998.08.26)
 João José da Costa, Carmelite Order (O. Carm.) (2017.01.18 – ...), previously Bishop of  Iguatu (Brazil) (2009.01.07 – 2014.11.05), Coadjutor Archbishop of Aracaju (2014.11.05 – succession 2017.01.18).

Other affiliated bishops

Coadjutor archbishops
José Palmeira Lessa (1996-1998)
João José da Costa, O. Carm. (2016-2017)

Auxiliary bishops
Nivaldo Monte (1963-1965), appointed Apostolic Administrator of Natal, Rio Grande do Norte
Luciano José Cabral Duarte (1966-1971), appointed Archbishop here
Edvaldo Gonçalves Amaral, S.D.B. (1975-1980), appointed Bishop of Parnaíba, Piaui
Hildebrando Mendes Costa (1981-1986), appointed Bishop of Estância, Sergipe
João Maria Messi, O.S.M. (1988-1995), appointed Bishop of Irecê, Bahia
Dulcênio Fontes de Matos (2001-2006), appointed Bishop of Palmeira dos Índios, Alagoas
Henrique Soares da Costa (2009-2014), appointed Bishop of Palmares, Pernambuco

Other priests of this diocese who became bishops
Manuel Raimundo de Melo, appointed Bishop of Caetité, Bahia in 1914
Avelar Brandão Vilela. appointed 
Bishop of Petrolina, Pernambuco in 1946; future Cardinal
Luciano José Cabral Duarte. Appointed Auxiliary Bishop of Aracaju, Sergipe in 1966.
Marco Eugênio Galrão Leite de Almeida, appointed Bishop of Estância, Sergipe in 2003
Carlos Alberto dos Santos, appointed Bishop of Teixeira de Freitas-Caravelas, Bahia in 2005
Valdemir Vicente Andrade Santos, appointed Auxiliary Bishop of Fortaleza, Ceara in 2018

Sources and external links 
 GCatholic.org with Google mapa & - satellite photo; data for all sections
 Catholic Hierarchy
 Diocese website

Roman Catholic dioceses in Brazil
Roman Catholic ecclesiastical provinces in Brazil
 
Christian organizations established in 1910
Sergipe
Roman Catholic dioceses and prelatures established in the 20th century
1910 establishments in Brazil
Aracaju